Stephen Báthory of Ecsed (1555 – 25 July 1605) was judge royal of the Kingdom of Hungary from 1586 to 1605.

Early life 

Stephen was the son of György Báthory (from the Ecsed branch of the family), and his distant relative, Anna Báthory (from the Somlyó branch). He was born in 1555. His younger sister was the infamous Elizabeth Báthory.

Ancestors

References

Sources 

 
 

1555 births
1605 deaths
Stephen Bathory (1555–1605)
Judges royal